Lotoria perryi is a species of predatory sea snail, a marine gastropod mollusk in the family Cymatiidae.

Description

Distribution
This species of marine snail lives in the Indo-Pacific oceans.

References

 Gastropods.com (archived)

External links
 Image at: 

Cymatiidae
Gastropods described in 1963